Pelligra is an Italian surname. Notable people with the surname include: 

 Biagio Pelligra (born 1937), Italian actor
 Raffaele Pelligra (1888–1971), Italian general
 Salvatore Pelligra (1891–1943), Italian general

Italian-language surnames